ʿAlī ibn al-Ḥusayn ibn al-Wāfid al-Lakhmī (c. 1008 – 1074), known in Latin Europe as , was an Andalusian Arab pharmacologist and physician from Toledo. He was the vizier of Al-Mamun of Toledo. His main work is Kitāb al-adwiya al-mufrada (translated into Latin as ).

Ibn al-Wafid was mainly a pharmacist in Toledo, and he used the techniques and methods available in alchemy to extract at least 520 different kinds of medicines from various plants and herbs.

References

External links
The Filāḥa Texts Project: Ibn Wāfid

Toledo, on Muslim Heritage.com, page 6  (retrieved November 26, 2008)

990s births
1074 deaths
11th-century people from al-Andalus
People from Toledo, Spain
Alchemists of the medieval Islamic world
11th-century physicians
Physicians from al-Andalus
Year of death uncertain
Pharmacologists from al-Andalus
11th-century Arabs
Viziers